Following is a list of major incidents involving terror groups operating in Tunisia. Note: the perpetrators are not counted in the dead or wounded below.  These are all radical Islamic terrorism unless otherwise noted.

References

Tunisia
Terrorist incidents
Terrorist incidents